Yelü Xiuge (耶律休哥) (died 998) was an important Khitan general and politician in imperial China's Liao dynasty. He commanded a disciplined army and fought the Song forces for several decades, taking care to not harm any innocent individual. The History of Liao records that adults in Song Dynasty would yell "Here comes Yuyue (于越; Yelü Xiuge's title)!" to stop children from crying.

Yelü Xiuge's tomb was discovered in 2002 in Fuxin, Liaoning Province of China.

In popular culture
Portrayed by Ruan Shengwen in the 2020 Chinese TV series The Legend of Xiao Chuo.

References

  Toqto'a et al., History of Liao, vol. 83 (Yelü Xiuge)

Liao dynasty generals
998 deaths
Year of birth unknown

Yelü clan
10th-century Khitan people